Aurélie Filippetti (born 17 June 1973) is a French politician and novelist. She served as French Minister of Culture and Communications from 2012 until 2014, first in the government of Jean-Marc Ayrault and then in the government of Manuel Valls.

Early life and career
Filippetti is of Italian descent and her family originates from Gualdo Tadino, Umbria. She is an alumna of the elite École normale supérieure de Fontenay–Saint-Cloud, she received an agrégation in Classic Literature.

Career as a writer
Filippetti's first novel Les derniers jours de la classe Ouvrière (The Last Days of the Working Class), published by Stock in 2003, has been translated into several languages. In 2003, Filippetti wrote the script for the theatre production Fragments d'humanité.

Political career
Filippetti was a delegate of the French Greens for the Paris municipality and acted as the technical adviser for the Minister of the Environment, Yves Cochet, from 2001 to 2002.

From 2007 until 2012, Filippetti was a member of the National Assembly of France, representing the Moselle département. In parliament, she served on the Committee on Cultural Affairs (2007-2008), the Committee on Legal Affairs (2008-2010) and the Finance Committee (2010-2012).

On Filippetti's initiative, the National Assembly passed a law in 2013 preventing internet booksellers from offering free delivery to customers, in an attempt to protect the country's struggling bookshops from the growing dominance of US online retailer Amazon. In 2014, Filippetti dismissed Anne Baldassari, the director of the Musée Picasso, after mounting criticism of her management.

Following the resignation of Arnaud Montebourg in protest against Hollande's economic policies, Filippetti and Benoît Hamon also resigned on 25 August 2014.

Following her resignation, Filippetti returned to parliament, where she served on the Finance Committee from 2014 until 2017. In the vote on the 2015 budget, she was one of 39 socialist deputies who abstained. She lost her parliamentary seat in the 2017 election.

In the Socialist Party's presidential primaries, Filippetti endorsed Montebourg as the party's candidate for that year's presidential elections. When Hamon was chosen instead, she joined his campaign team as spokesperson.

Filippetti was excluded for 18 months after supporting a dissident list, and announced January, 17th 2018 that she left the Socialist Party and joined Génération.s., the political movement of Benoît Hamon, her former colleague in the French Government.

Later in 2018, Filippetti announced her intention to resign from politics.

Controversy
On 9 November 2004, Filippetti and Xavière Tibéri wrangled after a tense district council meeting. Each of them accused the other one of assault or threats. Tibéri had a head trauma, which she claimed was caused by Filipetti pushing her over; she filed a complaint.

In 2008, Filipetti made headlines when she went public with allegations that former IMF head Dominique Strauss-Kahn had sexually attacked her.

Personal life
Filippetti was in a relationship with economist Thomas Piketty. In 2009, she filed a complaint of domestic violence against him; Piketty apologized for his actions and Filippetti quickly dropped the charges.

In September 2014, Filippetti and Arnaud Montebourg sued Paris Match for invasion of privacy for reporting they are romantically involved; the weekly's cover featured a photo of them during a trip to San Francisco.

From 2014 to the beginning of 2017, Filippetti had a relationship with Montebourg, with whom she had a daughter, Jeanne, born in September 2015. Her first daughter, Clara, is from a previous relationship.

Bibliography
 Les Derniers Jours de la Classe ouvrière, Stock, 2003, Réédité en Livre de Poche
 Un homme dans la poche, Stock, 2006

See also
 Audun-le-Tiche#Historical association with mining

References

External links
 Blog of Aurélie Filippetti 
 

1973 births
Living people
People from Meurthe-et-Moselle
French people of Italian descent
People of Umbrian descent
Socialist Party (France) politicians
French Ministers of Culture
ENS Fontenay-Saint-Cloud-Lyon alumni
21st-century French women politicians
21st-century French novelists
21st-century French women writers
French women novelists
Women government ministers of France
Women members of the National Assembly (France)
Deputies of the 13th National Assembly of the French Fifth Republic
Commandeurs of the Ordre des Arts et des Lettres
Politicians from Grand Est